Mexican amber, also known as Chiapas Amber is amber found in Mexico, created during the Early Miocene  and middle Miocene epochs of the Cenozoic Era in southwestern North America. As with other ambers, a wide variety of taxa have been found as inclusions including insects and other arthropods, as well as plant fragments and epiphyllous fungi.

Context 

Mexican amber is mainly recovered from fossil bearing rocks in the Simojovel region of Chiapas, Mexico. It is one of the main minerals recovered in the state of Chiapas, much of which is from 15 to 23 million years old, with quality comparable to that found in the Dominican Republic. Chiapan amber has a number of unique qualities, including much that is clear all the way through and some with fossilized insects and plants. Most Chiapan amber is worked into jewelry including pendants, rings and necklaces. Colors vary from white to yellow/orange to a deep red, but there are also green and pink tones as well. Since pre-Hispanic times, native peoples have believed amber to have healing and protective qualities.

The largest amber mine is in Simojovel, a small village 130 km from Tuxtla Gutiérrez, which produces 95% of Chiapas' amber. Other mines are found in Huitiupán, Totolapa, El Bosque, Pueblo Nuevo Solistahuacán, Pantelhó and San Andrés Duraznal. According to the Museum of Amber in San Cristóbal, almost 300 kg of amber is extracted per month from the state. Prices vary depending on quality and color.

The amber dates from between 15 million years old, for the youngest sediments of the Balumtun Sandstone and 22.5 million years old for the oldest La Quinta Formation.

Origin 
The amber was produced by either the two extinct leguminous trees Hymenaea mexicana or Hymenaea allendis, both of which were initially described from fossil flowers included in Mexican amber.

Fossil inclusions 

The Tityus apozonalli scorpion holotype fossil is composed of a very complete adult male recovered from the Guadalupe Victoria site. The amber dates from between 23 million years old at the oldest and 15 million years at the youngest. The Guadalupe Victoria site is an outcrop of amber bearing strata belonging to the Mazantic Shale and Balumtum Sandstone. The deposits preserve a transitional river or stream environments near the coast and preserves fossils of a mangrove forest ecosystem. Asteromites mexicanus is an epiphyllous coelomycetes fungus species recovered on a petal. Nine specimens of Miocene crabs are known as inclusions in Chiapas amber.

Arthropod species 
 Anbarrhacus adamantis (a millipede)
 Aphaenogaster praerelicta  (an ant)
 Culoptila aguilerai (a caddisfly)
 Dicromantispa electromexicana (a mantidfly)
 Hyptia deansi (a wasp)
 Leptopharsa tacanae (a lace bug)
 Maatidesmus paachtun (a millipede)
 Mastotermes electromexicus (a termite)
 Parastemmiulus elektron (a millipede)
 Schwenckfeldina archoica (a fungus gnat)
 Termitaradus protera (a termite bug)
 Tonocatecutlius sp. (a planthopper)
 Tityus apozonalli (a scorpion)
 Tityus knodeli (a scorpion)
 Tesserocerus simojovelensis Peris and Solórzano Kraemer 2015 (ambrosia beetle)
 Cenocephalus tenuis Peris and Solórzano Kraemer 2015 (ambrosia beetle)
 Mesorhaga pseudolacrymans Bickel 2016  (long-legged fly)
 Amblypsilopus monicae Bickel 2016 (long-legged fly)
 Medetera totolapa Bickel 2016  (long-legged fly)
 Medetera amissa Bickel 2016  (long-legged fly)
 Peloropeodes paleomexicana Bickel 2016  (long-legged fly)
 Neoparentia chiapensis Bickel 2016  (long-legged fly)
 Litaneutria pilosuspedes Terriquez et al. 2022 (mantis)

References

External links 
 

 
Mexican Designation of Origin
Fossils of Mexico
Natural history of Chiapas
Amber
Amber
Miocene life of North America
Oligocene life of North America
Mining in Mexico